Sagsai is a sum (district) of Bayan-Ölgii Province in western Mongolia. It is primarily inhabited by ethnic Kazakhs (Altaic Kazakhs). As of 2014 it had a population of 4945 people.

The district is home to a large number of eagle hunters who use golden eagles to hunt foxes and hares. Each year, Sagsai hosts the Altai Kazakh Eagle Festival and Sagsai Golden Eagle Festival on the last weekend of September to celebrate its heritage.

References

Further reading 
 Soma, Takuya. 2012. ‘Horse-Riding Falconry in Altai-Kazakh Nomadic Society: Anthropological Researches in Summertime Activities of Falconers and Golden Eagle’. Japanese Journal of Human and Animal Relation 32: pp. 38–47.
 Soma. 2013. ‘Hunting Arts of Eagle Falconers in the Altai-Kazakhs: Contemporary Operations of Horse-Riding Falconry in Sagsai County, Western Mongolia’. Japanese Journal of Human and Animal Relation 35: pp. 58–66.
 Soma & Battulga, Sukhee. 2014. 'Altai Kazakh Falconry as Heritage Tourism: “The Golden Eagle Festival” of Western Mongolia', "The International Journal of Intangible Heritage vol. 9", edited by Alissandra Cummins, pp. 135–148. Seoul: The National Folk Museum of Korea. International Journal of Intangible Heritage
 Soma. 2014. 'Current Situation and Issues of Transhumant Animal Herding in Sagsai County, Bayan Ulgii Province, Western Mongolia', E-journal GEO 9(1): pp. 102–119. 
 Soma. 2015. Human and Raptor Interactions in the Context of a Nomadic Society: Anthropological and Ethno-Ornithological Studies of Altaic Kazakh Falconry and its Cultural Sustainability in Western Mongolia. University of Kassel Press, Kassel (Germany) .
 相馬拓也 2012「アルタイ＝カザフ鷹匠による騎馬鷹狩猟: イヌワシと鷹匠の夏季生活誌についての基礎調査」『ヒトと動物の関係学会誌（vol. 32）』: pp. 38–47.
 相馬拓也 2013「アルタイ=カザフ鷹匠たちの狩猟誌: モンゴル西部サグサイ村における騎馬鷹狩猟の実践と技法の現在」『ヒトと動物の関係学会誌（vol.35）』: pp. 58–66.
 相馬拓也 2014 「モンゴル西部バヤン・ウルギー県サグサイ村における移動牧畜の現状と課題」, 『E-Journal GEO vol. 9 (no. 1) 』: pp. 102–189
 相馬拓也 2022『草原の掟－西部モンゴル遊牧社会における生存戦略のエスノグラフィ』（ナカニシヤ出版／2022年1月）
 日本放送協会(NHK). 2003. 『地球に好奇心：大草原にイヌワシが舞う～モンゴル・カザフ族 鷹匠の親子～』: NHKエンタープライズ(co-produced by 群像舎), 10:05-10:57 (13 December 2003), NHK-BS2 Television.
 日本放送協会(NHK). 2010. 『アジアンスマイル: 僕とイヌワシの冬物語～モンゴル・サグサイ村～』: NHKエンタープライズ(co-produced by 株式会社グループ現代), 18:30-18:50 (16 January 2010), NHK BS1 Television.

Populated places in Mongolia
Districts of Bayan-Ölgii Province